BZO-CHMOXIZID (CHM-MDA-19) is a synthetic cannabinoid compound first reported in 2008 in the same series as the better known derivative MDA-19. It started to be widely sold as an ingredient in grey-market synthetic cannabis blends in 2021 following the introduction of legislation in China which for the first time introduced general controls on various classes of synthetic cannabinoids, but did not include the group to which MDA-19 and BZO-CHMOXIZID belong. While BZO-CHMOXIZID is the most potent compound at CB1 from this so-called "OXAZID" series, it is still markedly CB2 selective and of relatively low potency at CB1, with an EC50 of 84.6 nM at CB1 compared to 2.21 nM at CB2.

References 

Cannabinoids
Hydrazides
Cyclohexyl compounds